La belle américaine is a French comedy film from 1961, directed by Robert Dhéry, written by Alfred Adam and starring Alfred Adam and Louis de Funès. The film was known under the titles La bella americana (Italian), The American Beauty (English) and Der tolle Amerikaner (German).

Plot
The wife of a rich man learns that her husband has an affair with a younger woman. She takes revenge on him by selling his beloved big car for little money. The worker Marcel Perrignon is very happy about this bargain but when his boss sees the car, he envies him and Perrignon gets fired. This is the start of a number of mishaps for Perrignon.

Cast

References

External links 
 
 La belle Américaine at the Films de France

1961 films
French comedy films
1960s French-language films
French black-and-white films
Films directed by Robert Dhéry
Films about automobiles
Films scored by Gérard Calvi
1960s French films